Maja Bojs is a  mountain near the center of the Accursed Mountains range in northern Albania near the border with Montenegro. It is just above the Buni Jezerce valley (meaning 'Valley of the Lakes') where Big lake of Buni Jezerce is located with five other lakes.

References

Mountains of Albania
Accursed Mountains